Mitrinae, known as mitre shells, are a taxonomic subfamily of sea snails, widely distributed marine gastropod molluscs in the family Mitridae.

Genera
 Acromargarita S.-I Huang, 2021 
 Calcimitra Huang, 2011
 Cancillopsis Fedosov, Herrmann, Kantor & Bouchet, 2018
 † Dentimitra von Koenen, 1890 †
 Domiporta Cernohorsky, 1970
 Episcomitra Monterosato, 1917
 Eumitra Tate, 1889
 Fusidomiporta Fedosov, Herrmann, Kantor & Bouchet, 2018
 Gemmulimitra Fedosov, Herrmann, Kantor & Bouchet, 2018
 Mitra Röding, 1798
 Neotiara Fedosov, Herrmann, Kantor & Bouchet, 2018
 Profundimitra Fedosov, Herrmann, Kantor & Bouchet, 2018
 Pseudonebularia Fedosov, Herrmann, Kantor & Bouchet, 2018
 Quasimitra Fedosov, Herrmann, Kantor & Bouchet, 2018
 Roseomitra Fedosov, Herrmann, Kantor & Bouchet, 2018
 Ziba H. Adams & A. Adams, 1853

References

External links
 Swainson W. (1829-1833). Zoological Illustrations, or original figures and descriptions of new, rare, or interesting animals, selected chiefly from the classes of ornithology, entomology, and conchology, and arranged according to their apparent affinities. Second series. London: Baldwin & Cradock
  Fedosov A., Puillandre N., Herrmann M., Kantor Yu., Oliverio M., Dgebuadze P., Modica M.V. & Bouchet P. (2018). The collapse of Mitra: molecular systematics and morphology of the Mitridae (Gastropoda: Neogastropoda). Zoological Journal of the Linnean Society. 183(2): 253-337

Mitridae